Crossett Municipal Auditorium is a historic auditorium building at 1100 Main Street in Crossett, Arkansas.  The building was listed in the National Register of Historic Places on September 20, 2007.

Crossett Municipal Auditorium was the site of practices and the final competition (modelling, speech, and impromptu questions) in the Miss Rodeo Arkansas pageant of 2007. Miss Brittany Sing was declared Miss Rodeo Arkansas on August 4, 2007.  Preceding that announcement, Abby McCallie was declared Miss Rodeo Arkansas Princess and Miss Kirbi Allen was declared Teen Miss Rodeo Arkansas.

See also
National Register of Historic Places listings in Ashley County, Arkansas

References

Event venues on the National Register of Historic Places in Arkansas
National Register of Historic Places in Ashley County, Arkansas